Finland competed at the 1932 Summer Olympics in Los Angeles, California, United States.

Medalists

References

Official Olympic Reports
International Olympic Committee results database

Nations at the 1932 Summer Olympics
1932
1932 in Finnish sport
Finnish-American culture in California